Ladenbergia oblongifolia, many synonyms, including Ladenbergia gavanensis, is a species of plant in the family Rubiaceae. It is native to the north-west of South America: Bolivia, northern Brazil, Colombia, Ecuador, Peru and Venezuela.

Conservation
Ladenbergia gavanensis was assessed as "vulnerable" in the 1998 IUCN Red List, where it is said to be native only to Peru. , L. gavanensis was regarded as a synonym of Ladenbergia oblongifolia, which has a much wider distribution.

References

oblongifolia
Flora of Bolivia
Flora of Brazil
Flora of Colombia
Flora of Ecuador
Flora of Peru
Flora of Venezuela
Vulnerable plants
Taxonomy articles created by Polbot